The San Jorge River is a river in Colombia that begins in National Park Paramillo (departments of Antioquia and Córdoba) and that runs between the mountains of San Geronimo and Ayapel before flowing into the River Cauca in Sucre Department.

The drainage basin comprises  in the southeast of Córdoba Department, including the waters of Ayapel swamp and the Mompox region via the Caribbean departments of Cordoba, Sucre and Bolivar. Its tributaries are the rivers San Pedro, Dirty and Ure.

Currently the San Jorge is one of the rivers with fish wealth, but its high pollution and deterioration was due largely to fishing with explosives and obtaining gold alluvium of its waters by the method of flotation mercury.

History 
The San Jorge was found by the Spanish conquistador Alonso de Heredia, while seeking to establish contact with the indigenous Zenú culture in the 1530s. At that time the river was known under the name of Xegú or Jegu and its banks flourished numerous villages of pre-Columbian society as Yape Zenú (now Ayapel, Córdoba) and Tacasuán (now San Benito Abad). Heredia gave the name of St. George in honor of the Christian saint who fought a dragon.

In 1966 an American aviator sighted an extensive network of canals and artificial ridges along the San Jorge, finding that the "raking" was not natural but a work of human engineering. As this is an area that remains flooded for several months a year, it was necessary to create a drainage system to allow the permanent establishment of the population there.

See also
List of rivers of Colombia

References
Rand McNally, The New International Atlas, 1993.

Rivers of Colombia
Magdalena River